Charles Joseph Butler (August 15, 1920 – October 5, 2014) was an American professional basketball player. He played for the Chicago American Gears, Youngstown Bears, and Syracuse Nationals in the National Basketball League and averaged 6.4 points per game.

In his post-basketball career, Butler worked for Commercial Shearing and Stamping in Youngstown, Ohio for 35 years before retiring.

References

1920 births
2014 deaths
American men's basketball players
Chicago American Gears players
Forwards (basketball)
Guards (basketball)
Notre Dame Fighting Irish men's basketball players
Basketball players from Chicago
Basketball players from Youngstown, Ohio
Syracuse Nationals players
Youngstown Bears players
United States Navy personnel of World War II